NA-158 Vehari-III is a constituency for the National Assembly of Pakistan.

Election 2002 

General elections were held on 10 Oct 2002. Khan Aftab Khan Khichi of PML-Q won by 61,536 votes.

Election 2008 

General elections were held on 18 Feb 2008. Tehmina Daultana of PML-N won by 48,999 votes.

Election 2013 

General elections were held on 11 May 2013. Tahir Iqbal Chaudhary an Independent Candidate won by 97,856 votes and became the  member of National Assembly.

Election 2018 

General elections are scheduled to be held on 25 July 2018.

By-election 2023 
A by-election will be held on 19 March 2023 due to the resignation of Tahir Iqbal Chaudhry, the previous MNA from this seat.

See also
NA-157 Vehari-II
NA-159 Vehari-IV

References

External links 
Election result's official website

NA-169